Wild Wild West: The Steel Assassin is an action-adventure video game published and developed by SouthPeak Interactive for Microsoft Windows. It is based on the 1999 film of the same name (which in turn is based on the 1960s TV series The Wild Wild West, whose episode "Night of the Steel Assassin" shares its name with the game). A PlayStation version of the game was planned, but was cancelled.

Plot 
Five years after the assassination of Abraham Lincoln, the tension between the North and the South is rising again. President Ulysses S. Grant has received a death threat and it's up to U.S. Army Captain James "Jim" T. West and U.S. Marshal Artemus Gordon to save him.

Gameplay 
The game sees the player as either West or Gordon in a fully interactive 3D world where he interacts with the characters and objects via hotspots. Puzzles need to be completed in order to advance through the story.

Reception 

The game received "mixed" reviews according to the review aggregation website GameRankings. Jim Preston of NextGen said that the game was "better than a rattlesnake in your boot."

References

External links 
 

1999 video games
Action-adventure games
Adventure games
Alternate history video games
Cancelled PlayStation (console) games
SouthPeak Games
Video games about police officers
Video games based on films
Video games based on adaptations
Video games developed in the United States
Western (genre) video games
Windows games
Windows-only games
Cultural depictions of Ulysses S. Grant
Video games featuring black protagonists